The Paco de Lucía Sextet is a flamenco music sextet, formed by guitarist Paco de Lucía and other musicians. The band has released three albums. In 1990 Paco de Lucia released Zyryab, an album made with his sextet and also featuring jazz pianist Chick Corea.

Personnel

1981
 Paco de Lucía, guitar
 Pepe de Lucía, cante (vocals)
 Jorge Pardo, flute, soprano saxophone
 Carles Benavent, bass
 Rubem Dantas, percussion
 Ramón de Algeciras, guitar
 Rafael Sánchez de Vargas, guitar

1984
 Paco de Lucía, guitar
 Pepe de Lucía, rhythm guitar
 Jorge Pardo, flute, soprano saxophone
 Carles Benavent, bass
 Rubem Dantas, percussion
 Rafael Sánchez de Vargas, guitar

1997
 Paco de Lucía, guitar
 Duquende, cante (vocals)
 Jorge Pardo, flute, soprano saxophone
 Carles Benavent, bass
 Rubem Dantas, percussion
 Ramón de Algeciras, guitar

Partial discography
 Sólo quiero caminar (1981)
 Live... One Summer Night (1984)
 Live in América (1993)

References

Flamenco groups